Nuzvid revenue division is an administrative division in the Eluru district of the Indian state of Andhra Pradesh. It is one of the 3 revenue divisions in the district with 6 mandals under its administration. Nuzvid serves as the headquarters of the division. The division has 1 municipality.

Mandals 
The mandals in the division are

See also 
List of revenue divisions in Andhra Pradesh
Machilipatnam revenue division
Vijayawada revenue division
Gudivada revenue division

References 

Revenue divisions in Eluru district